Työmies (The Worker) was the official organ of the Social Democratic Party of Finland. The paper was launched in 1895 and continued until the suppression of the Finnish Socialist Workers' Republic in 1918.

History
Työmies (The Worker) was established by the Helsinki Workers' Association in 1895. The paper's first editor was Adam Hermann Karvonen, an elementary school teacher.

The paper was terminated after the Battle of Helsinki in 1918, when the German tropps invaded Helsinki during the Finnish Civil War.

The paper was succeeded as the official organ of the Social Democratic Party of Finland by the Suomen Sosialidemokraatti (Finnish Social-Democrat), later known as Demari (The Socialist) and Uutispäivä Demari (Socialist News). Since 2012 the paper has assumed the name Demokraatti (The Democrat).

Editors-in-chief
 Aatami Hermanni Karvonen, 1895–1896
 Matti Kurikka, 1897–1899
 August Bernhard Mäkelä, 1900–1901
 Edvard Valpas-Hänninen, 1901–1918

References

External links
 Työmies (1895–1910), Finnish National Library Digitization and Conservation Centre. —Set of pdf issues.

1895 establishments in Finland
1918 disestablishments in Finland
Defunct newspapers published in Finland
Finnish-language newspapers
Publications established in 1895
Publications disestablished in 1918
Socialist newspapers
Newspapers published in Helsinki